Rukungiri Water Supply and Sanitation Project (RWSSP), also Rukungiri Water Supply and Sewerage System, is a water intake, purification, distribution and waste water collection and disposal system in the town of Rukungiri, in the Western Region of Uganda. When completed, the system is expected to supply  of water daily, to about 120,000 people in the town of Rukungiri and neighboring communities in Rukungiri District and to parts of Ntungamo District. The infrastructure development project is being jointly funded by the World Bank and the Government of Uganda.

Location
The new water treatment plant is located at Kabingo Village, Kebisoni Sub-county, in Rukungiri District.

History
In 2016, the World Bank and the Government of Uganda contracted the Indian company Technofab Engineering, to implement this project. However, as of March 2021, over five years since the contract was awarded, only an estimated 35 percent of work was completed, on a project that was planned to last two years. In March 2021, the contract with the Indian contractor was terminated and National Water and Sewerage Corporation, was assigned the responsibility to complete the project.

Overview
As part of efforts to avail adequate potable water to  Rukungiri District, the government of Uganda, together with other development partners, devised the Rukungiri Water Supply And Sanitation Project. It is divided into two phases, Phase I and Phase II. The total budgeted cost of both phases is USh44 billion (approx. US$12 million).

Phase 1

Phase 1 involves the construction of new intake of raw water at the Kahengye River, with a pumping station. The raw water to be pumped to a new water treatment plant at Kabingo Village, Kebisoni Sub-county. A new administration building, a power generator and electromechanical house to be built.

Phase 2

Phase II improvements include the construction of five reservoirs as illustrated in the table below. NWSC plans to build public toilets in Rukungiri town, to ease sewerage needs in the urban centre.

Other considerations
Following completion of Phase II, the entire system is designed to supply  of clean water daily. The population in Rukungiri District has need of potable water estimated at  daily. Before this project they were getting only  a day. The project is reported to cost USh$44 billion (approx. US$12 million).

Completion
On 24 November 2022, the completed water supply and sanitation project was handed over to the Ugandan Ministry of Water and Environment by Engineer Silver Mugisha, the CEO of National Water and Sewerage Corporation (NWSC). NWSC served as the general contractor for this project. The water and sanitation parastatal was also selected to serve as the operations and maintenance contractor. The project is expected to serve an estimated 163,000 people in Rukungiri Town, parts of Rukungiri District and parts of Ntungamo District, at least until 2040.

See also
 Ministry of Water and Environment (Uganda)
 Busia Water Supply and Sanitation Project
 Gulu Water Supply and Sanitation Project

References

External links
 Website of National Water & Sewerage Corporation
 Website of Ministry of Water and Environment (Uganda)

Buildings and structures in Uganda
Rukungiri District
Water resources management
Western Region, Uganda